There's Something About Ashley is a documentary released by Warner Bros. Records about the beginning of Ashley Tisdale's solo music career and was released on November 6, 2007. The DVD includes 3 new music videos from her debut album Headstrong and a documentary. The music videos in the DVD are "He Said, She Said", "Not Like That", and "Suddenly", which are all directed by Scott Speer. Tisdale's sister Jennifer and Josh Henderson from Desperate Housewives made appearances.

Track listing
There's Something About Ashley (12:07) - A three-song music video trilogy comprising:
 Tisdale talking at Cell-phone (Intro)
 "He Said She Said" (Music Video)
 Tisdale with Jennifer in her bedroom (Interlude)
 "Not Like That" (Music Video)
 "Suddenly" (Music Video)
 Josh Henderson and Tisdale (Ending)

The Life and Times of Ashley Tisdale (45:00) - Follow Tisdale through the making of Headstrong in 45 minutes of exclusive nonstop footage.
" Intro"*
"Recording Be Good to Me" (Appearances by Kara DioGuardi)*
"Album Photoshoot*
"Dog Issues" (Appearances by Kara DioGuardi)*
"Play Ball" (Appearances by Brenda Song and Jennifer Tisdale)*
"Recording He Said She Said" * (Appearances by J.R. Rotem and Evan "Kidd" Bogart) *
"Homecoming"*
"The Hair"*
"Laguna Beach" (Appearances by Jennifer Tisdale) * 
"High School Musical Rehearsals" (Appearances by Corbin Bleu)*
"First Live Performance (Appearances by Corbin Bleu)*
"Thanksgiving Day Parade" (Appearances by Corbin Bleu and Monique Coleman)*
"Meeting Jessica Simpson"* 
"Music Video Shoot" (Appearances by Scott Speer, Jennifer Tisdale and Josh Henderson)
"St. Louis" 
"Album Drops" 
"CD Signing"
"TRL" (Appearances by MTV VJ Vanessa Minnillo)
"Ending"
All footage marked with a * is included on Headstrong CD+DVD version.

Production and personnel

Director – Scott Speer
Producer – Alison Foster
Executive Producer – Denise A. Williams
Executive Producer – David Grant
Production Supervisor – Julie Di Cataldo
Asst. Production Supervisor – Sharonda Starks
Assistant Director – Mike Estrella
Assistant Director – Saleem Beaseley
Director of Photography – Omer Ganai
Gaffer – Mark Lindsay
Best Boy Electrician – Mattai
Electric – Rudy Covarrubias
Key Grip – Colby Dunford
Best Boy Grip – Curtis Brown

Production Designer – Effney Gardea
Leadman – Ian Berky
Set Dresser – Darren Bertonneau
Set Dresser – Lance Lindahl
Shopper – Bianca Butti
Art Assistant – Lee Ferris
MakeUp/Hair Ashley Tisdale – Torsten White
Stylist Ashley Tisdale – Laury Smith
Asst. to Stylist – Daisy Alexander
MakeUp/Hair – Kristina Duff
Casting – Visionary Casting
Choreographer – Nancy O'Meara

Music videos
"He Said She Said": There's Something About Ashley premiered the music video for "He Said She Said" which begins with Tisdale and her friends go to a club and a guy (Josh Henderson) notices Tisdale at the club. She starts to dance with her friends and looks after the guy. Tisdale's sister Jennifer appears on the video as one of her friends.
"Not Like That": The music video was filmed by Scott Speer, Tisdale starts to read a magazine with gossip about her. We see her in her room singing, at work — filming a commercial — and in a magazine.
"Suddenly": In the video Tisdale starts off on a plain white background and during the video it starts to form a crowd that gets bigger and bigger the video also includes shots from the DVD in the Target exclusive edition of her debut album Headstrong.....

Notes

External links
 There's Something About Ashley DVD Trailer

2007 video albums
Ashley Tisdale video albums